This is a list of railway stations named after people. It details the name of the railway station, its location and eponym. All these facilities' names end with "station", unless otherwise noted.

See also
List of eponyms
List of places named after people
List of railway stations

References 

Eponyms
Railway stations